Sacred Heart Grammar School, Newry, County Down, Northern Ireland, is a grammar school with 855 students and 51 full-time teachers. Established in 1930 by the Sisters of St. Clare. It is one of Northern Ireland’s top grammar schools.

Brief history
The school was established in 1930 by the Sisters of St. Clare on a site adjacent to the Poor Clare Convent in Castle Street, Newry.  Due to steady expansion of student numbers the school rapidly outgrew the original six classrooms and by the 1980s teaching required over 30 mobile classrooms.

The school relocated to a new state-of-the-art complex at Ashgrove, Newry in 1985. It now occupies a  site on the Northern side of the city and has views of the Mourne Mountains to the East. It was formally opened by Mr J. Parkes, the then Permanent Secretary to the Department of Education. A further Science and Technology Block was opened in 1997 by Mr J. Smith, Assistant Secretary to the Department.

Academics
The school offers instruction in a full range of subjects through to A-level. 84.2% of its students who sat the A-level exams in 2017/18 were awarded three A*-C grades. In 2018 it was ranked 19th in Northern Ireland for its GCSE performance with 98.4% of its entrants receiving five or more GCSEs at grades A* to C, including the core subjects English and Maths.

Activities and Clubs
 Athletic Club
 Bank
 Badminton
 Camogie
 Drama Club
 Gaelic Football
 Golf
 Health Awareness Committee
 Junior / Senior Art Club
 Junior/ Senior Choir
 Junior/ Senior Orchestra  
 Liturgy Committee
 Mini Company
 Netball
 Politics Society
 Quiz Club

In addition to these, there is also a wide range of educational visits, expeditions and field trips.

Musicals and Operas
There is a strong tradition of musicals within Sacred Heart dating back to 1956; recent productions have been:
 (2018) - Guys and Dolls (musical)
 (2016) - Cats (musical)
 (2014) - Crazy for You
 (2012) - The Boy Friend
 (2010) - Joseph and the Amazing Technicolor Dreamcoat
 (2008) - My Fair Lady
 (2006) - Oklahoma!
 (2004) - Anything Goes
 (2002) - The Mikado
 (2000) - The King and I
 (1998) - Crazy for You
 (1996) - The Pirates of Penzance
 (1994) - Guys and Dolls
 (1992) - Oliver!
 (1990) - My Fair Lady

Principals
1930-1932 - Miss Angela Chambers
1932-1954 - Sr. Marie Celine Turley
1954-1961 - Sr. Teresa Mary Fitzpatrick
1961-1965 - Sr. Imelda Fahy
1965-1972 - Sr. Máire O'Hara
1972-1977 - Sr. Anne Thérèse O'Shea
1977-1989 - Sr. Mark Hollywood
1989-2000 - Sr. Patricia Rogers
2000-2017 - Sr. Julie McGoldrick
2017-2022 - Mr. Paul Kane
2022-Present - Mr. Shane Comer

Notable former pupils

 Dame Siobhan Keegan (b. 1972), Northern Ireland High Court judge
 Aislin McGuckin (b. 1974), actress (Heartbeat, Holby City, Outlander)
 Caroline O'Hanlon (b. 1984), Northern Ireland netball international and an Armagh Ladies' Gaelic footballer.
 Valene Kane (b. 1987), actress (The Fall, Rogue One)
 Megan Fearon (b. 1991), Former Sinn Féin MLA for Newry and Armagh, Junior Minister in the Northern Ireland Executive
 Liz Kimmins (b. 1999), Sinn Féin MLA for Newry and Armagh

References

External links
 Sacred Heart Grammar School web site

Grammar schools in County Down
Catholic secondary schools in Northern Ireland
Education in Newry
1930 establishments in Northern Ireland